Francis Michael Duff, ' (7 June 1889 – 7 November 1980), known as Frank Duff, was known especially for bringing attention to the role of the Catholic Laity during the Second Vatican Council of the Roman Catholic Church as well as for founding the Legion of Mary in his native city of Dublin, Ireland.

Biography

Early life
He was born in Dublin on 7 June 1889, at 97 Phibsboro Road, the eldest of seven children of John Duff (died 23 December 1918) and his wife, Susan Letitia (née Freehill, died 27 February 1950). The wealthy family lived in the city at St Patrick's Road, Drumcondra. Duff attended Blackrock College.

Early career
In 1908, he entered the Civil Service and was assigned to the Irish Land Commission.
In 1913, he joined the Society of St Vincent de Paul and was exposed to the real poverty of Dublin. Many who lived in tenement squalor were forced to attend soup kitchens for sustenance, and abject poverty, alcoholism, and prostitution were rife in parts of Dublin. Duff joined and soon rose through the ranks to President of the St Patrick's Conference at St Nicholas of Myra Parish. Duff, having concern for people he saw as materially and spiritually deprived, got the idea to picket Protestant soup kitchens as he considered they were giving aid in the form of food and free accommodation at hostels in return for not attending Catholic services. Duff set up rival Catholic soup kitchens and, with his friend, Sergeant Major Joe Gabbett, who had already been working at discouraging Catholics from patronizing Protestant soup kitchens. They succeeded in closing down two of them over the years.

In 1916, Duff published his first pamphlet, Can we be Saints?. In it, he expressed the conviction that all, without exception, are called to be saints, and that through Christian faith, all have the means necessary.

In 1918 a friend gifted Duff a copy of True Devotion to Mary by the seventeenth-century French cleric Louis de Montfort, which influenced his views on Mary. Duff was additionally influenced by the writings of John Henry Newman.

He briefly acted as private secretary to Michael Collins, the chairman of the Provisional Government and the commander-in-chief of the National Army. In 1924, he was transferred to the Department of Finance.

Legion of Mary

On 7 September 1921 Duff was a part of a meeting alongside Fr Michael Toher and fifteen women which became the nucleus of what would become the Legion of Mary. The Legion of Mary was created to organise lay Catholics to perform voluntary work. Duff modelled the organisation on Roman legions. Some of the first causes the Legion pursued was to become involved with homelessness and prostitution in Dublin city. In 1922 Duff established the Sancta Maria hostel in Dublin, a place to house prostitutes, and soon thereafter Duff and the Legion became highly involved in shutting down the Monto, Dublin's primary red-light district. In 1927 Duff established the Morning Star hostel for homeless men, followed shortly by the Regina Coeli hostel for homeless women in 1930. The Regin Coeli contained special units for unmarried mothers and their children, reflecting Duff's view that single mothers should be able to raise their children. This defied the cultural norm of the era which held the view that the children of single mothers should be put up for adoption as quickly as possible.

While Duff enjoyed the support of WT Cosgrave, Ireland's head of government, and in May 1931 Duff was granted an audience with Pope Pius XI, his efforts were opposed internally in the Dublin diocese. The Archbishop of Dublin Edward Joseph Byrne and his successor John Charles McQuaid sought to censor Duff because of his involvement with prostitutes. McQuaid also did not approve of Duff's ecumenical efforts; In the 1930s and 1940s Duff created the Mercier Society, a study group designed to bring together Catholics and Protestants, as well as the Pillar of Fire, a group designed to promote dialogue with Ireland's Jewish community. In communication with Irish social dissidents Sean O'Faolain and Peadar O'Donnell, Duffy suggested he was far more censored than even they were. 

Duff did have some supporters amongst the Catholic hierarchy though; with the backing of Cardinal Joseph MacRory and Francis Bourne of Westminster, the Legion was able to expand rapidly and internationally. In 1928 the Legion established its first praesidium (branch) in Scotland. In 1932 Duff was able to use the occasion of the Eucharistic Congress of Dublin to introduce the concept of the Legion of Mary to several visiting bishops, leading to further international growth.     

He retired from the Civil Service in 1934 to devote all of his time to the Legion of Mary. 

In July 1940, an overseas club for Afro-Asian students in Dublin was created. At that time Ireland was a popular destination for students from Asia and Africa because of its recent anti-imperial, anti-colonial history. Duff personally funded the purchase of a building for the club using funds from an inheritance. The club lasted until 1976 and would facilitate many notable students, including  Jaja Wachuku.

For the rest of his life, with the help of many others, Duff guided the Legion's worldwide extension. Today, the Legion of Mary has an estimated four million active members and 10 million auxiliary members in close to 200 countries in almost every diocese in the Catholic Church.

Later life
In 1965, Pope Paul VI invited Duff to attend the Second Vatican Council as a lay observer. When Duff was introduced to the assembly by Archbishop Heenan of Liverpool he received a standing ovation.

Duff made the promotion of devotion to the Sacred Heart of Jesus part of the Legion's apostolate.

Death
Duff died at 91 on 7 November 1980 in Dublin and was interred in that city's Glasnevin Cemetery. In July 1996, the cause of his canonization was introduced by Cardinal Desmond Connell.

Works

See also

References

Further reading

External links
Center for the Promotion of Legion of Mary Saints
Profile of Frank Duff
Official website for the Legion of Mary

1889 births
1980 deaths
20th-century venerated Christians
Burials at Glasnevin Cemetery
Irish Servants of God
Irish activists
Participants in the Second Vatican Council
People educated at Blackrock College
People from Dublin (city)
Roman Catholic activists
Servants of God